Andy Brannan (4 June 1919 – 13 February 1997) was an Australian rules footballer who played for the Richmond Football Club and Hawthorn Football Club in the Victorian Football League (VFL).

Notes

External links 

1919 births
1997 deaths
Australian rules footballers from Victoria (Australia)
Richmond Football Club players
Hawthorn Football Club players